The 1954–55 IHL season was the tenth season of the International Hockey League, a North American minor professional league. Six teams participated in the regular season, and the Cincinnati Mohawks won the Turner Cup.

Regular season

Turner Cup-Playoffs

Turner Cup playoffs

Semifinals

Cincinnati Mohawks 3, Toledo Mercurys 0

Troy Bruins 3, Grand Rapids Rockets 1

Turner Cup Finals

Cincinnati Mohawks 4, Troy Bruins 3

Awards

Coaches
Cincinnati Mohawks: Rollie McLenahan
Fort Wayne Komets: Pat Wilson
Grand Rapids Rockets: Norm Grinke
Johnstown Jets: Chirp Brenchley
Toledo Mercurys: Doug McCaig
Troy Bruins: N/A

References

Attendance Figures - Cincinnati Enquirer 03-16-1955 through 04-04-1955

External links
 Season 1954/55 on hockeydb.com

IHL
International Hockey League (1945–2001) seasons